Midlothian Council is the local authority for Midlothian, one of the 32 council areas of Scotland, covering an area immediately south of the city of Edinburgh. The council is based in Dalkeith. Since the last boundary changes in 2017, eighteen councillors have been elected from six wards.

History
Midlothian District Council was created in 1975 as one of four districts within the Lothian region. The Midlothian district took its name from the historic county of Midlothian, which had covered a larger area. The Lothian region was abolished in 1996, when the four districts in the region, including Midlothian, became unitary council areas.

Political control
The first election to the Midlothian District Council was held in 1974, initially operating as a shadow authority alongside the outgoing authorities until the new system came into force on 16 May 1975. A shadow authority was again elected in 1995 ahead of the reforms which came into force on 1 April 1996. Political control of the council since 1975 has been as follows:

Midlothian District Council

Midlothian Council

Leadership
Midlothian Council operates a cabinet-based decision making model working collaboratively with the Council and Performance Review Committee. Each cabinet member has a portfolio of responsibilities. The leaders of the council since 2003 have been:

Elections
Since 2007 elections have been held every five years under the single transferable vote system, introduced by the Local Governance (Scotland) Act 2004. Election results since 1995 have been as follows:

Premises
The council is based at Midlothian House at 40–46 Buccleuch Street in Dalkeith. The building was purpose-built for the district council in 1991 at a cost of £6 million.

Wards

The council is composed of 6 wards, each electing 3 councillors.

References

Politics of Midlothian
Local authorities of Scotland
Organisations based in Midlothian
Dalkeith